Mabra elephantophila is a moth of the family Crambidae. It is found in Thailand.

Adults feed on the tears of elephants. If the animal is not producing tears, the moth will irritate the eye, causing tears to be produced.

References

External links
Mabra elephantophila

Moths described in 1985
Pyraustinae